Magna Vista High School is a school name that can refer to:

 Magna Vista High School (Virginia)
 Magna Vista High School (California)